The 2022–23 season is Pafos's 9th year in existence, and sixth season in the Cypriot First Division.

Season review
On 11 June, Pafos announced Henning Berg as the clubs new Head Coach.

On 22 June, Pafos announced the loan signing of João Pedro from Athletico Paranaense until the end of the season.

On 25 June, Pafos announced the signing of Marcinho on a free transfer.

On 27 June, Pafos announced the signing of Marios Demetriou from PAEEK.

On 2 July, Pafos announced that they had extended the loan of Kenan Bajrić from Slovan Bratislava for an additional season. The following day, 3 July, Pafos announced the signing of Juninho from Zorya Luhansk. On 4 July, Pafos announced the signing of Bruno Tavares from Sporting CP.

On 21 July, Pafos announced the signing of Muamer Tanković from AEK Athens.

On 5 August, Pafos announced the signing of Pedro Pelágio on loan from Marítimo, and Levan Kharabadze from Dinamo Tbilisi.

On 8 August, Pafos announced the signing of Jordan Ikoko on a free transfer after he'd left Ludogorets Razgrad.

On 17 August, Pafos announced the signing of Oier Olazábal from Espanyol

On 23 August, Pafos announced the signing of Mamadou Kané on loan from Olympiacos.

On 30 August, Pafos announced the loan signing of Filip Majchrowicz from Radomiak Radom, whilst Moustapha Name signed from Paris FC the following day.

On 30 September, Pafos announced the signing of Besart Abdurahimi on loan from Akritas Chlorakas.

On 25 November, Onni Valakari extended his contract with Pafos until June 2026.

On 8 December, Josef Kvída extended his contract with Pafos until June 2026.

On 2 January, Jefté Betancor joined Pafos on loan for the remainder of the season.

On 25 January, Pafos announced that Hamadi Al Ghaddioui had left the club to join an unnamed 2. Bundesliga club.

On 26 January, Pafos announced the departure of Willy Semedo for a record fee, and the signing of Ivica Ivušić.

On 31 January, Pafos announced the signing of Bruno Felipe from Omonia.

Squad

Out on loan

Left club during season

Transfers

In

Loans in

Out

Loans out

Released

Friendlies

Competitions

Overview

Cyta Championship

Regular season

League table

Results summary

Results by results

Results

Championship round

League table

Results summary

Results by results

Results

Cypriot Cup

Squad statistics

Appearances and goals

|-
|colspan="14"|Players away on loan:
|-
|colspan="14"|Players who appeared for Pafos but left during the season:

|}

Goal scorers

Clean sheets

Disciplinary record

References

Pafos FC seasons
Pafos FC season